Evangelical Times (ET) is a monthly evangelical newspaper in the UK, published in a 32-page tabloid format. The editor is Mike Judge, pastor of Chorlton Evangelical Church. The newspaper is administered from its office in Darlington, County Durham.

The Evangelical Times fulfils an informative and supportive role for hundreds of evangelical churches in the UK. Readers can choose to subscribe to the hardcopy newspaper and/or to access digital content with ET online. As well as providing analysis of current affairs topics of interest to evangelical Christians of any denomination, the publication is used as a tool for evangelism, doctrinal teaching, missional support and prayer fellowship between churches.

Mission 
As a Christian publishing company and charitable trust, Evangelical Times is committed to the dissemination of biblical Christianity throughout the world, particularly through its hardcopy and online English language newspapers. It also aims to impart a biblical worldview that enables Christians to live and witness effectively for Christ, and to promote compassionate action for all humankind in a fallen and suffering world.

Content
The Evangelical Times opens with short news and current affairs analysis items of particular interest to evangelical Christians. The first news and analysis section is normally followed by church news and world news. An opinion, editorial and readers’ letters section precedes longer feature articles written by regular and guest writers. Articles address a range of cultural, political, ethical and other contemporary topics of interest to Christians as well as Church history, biography, theology and mission. A book review section follows this and feature articles then continue in the latter half of the paper. Towards the back of the paper, there is a church events diary and a classified section. The paper often closes with a full-page feature article on the back page.

Special editions 
The Christmas edition of Evangelical Times is purchased in larger quantities by churches and individuals to be given to friends and contacts. The June edition contains a comprehensive list of hundreds of UK Evangelical 'Holiday Churches' providing Christians travelling in, or visiting, the UK, with a regularly updated resource for accessing church worship and other services whilst away from home.

ET online
In common with the rest of the newspaper industry, The Evangelical Times hardcopy circulation has declined in recent decades. However, its global reach and ministry has continued to expand through its digital publication, website, social media channels and email newsletters. The ET website was launched in 2017 to provide an accessible portal for all Evangelical Times content and resources in digital format.

Evangelical Times International (ETi) 
ET International (ETi) is a slimmed-down 16-page missionary version of the Evangelical Times produced four times a year and is designed for low-cost airmail distribution throughout the world. ETi has become a highly valued publication in many countries, particularly those where little evangelical literature is available.

History

Early years 
The Evangelical Times was founded in 1967 by Dr Peter Masters, who was then pastor of Cowley Hill Free Church, Borehamwood and is currently minister at the Metropolitan Tabernacle, London. The newspaper’s inaugural issue was published in February 1967 in a 20-page tabloid format, with 20,000 copies printed.

The earliest copies were printed using traditional hot metal typesetting. Soon after, one of the first justified type IBM electronic typesetters was acquired for the newspaper’s production and a Welsh newspaper printing house pioneering new offset lithography technology was contracted to print the newspaper.

The original price of the Evangelical Times was 9d (equivalent to approximately 66p today). At that time, a first class stamp was 4d. The cover price is now £1.30 and, interestingly, the price of Evangelical Times hardcopy edition has remained around twice the cost of a UK first class stamp throughout its history.

In 1973, with editor Dr Peter Masters’ appointment as pastor of the Metropolitan Tabernacle, the Evangelical Times relocated its office from his home in Borehamwood to the church’s premises in Elephant and Castle, London.

Later administration 
In 1973, the editorship passed to Bob Horn and the office subsequently moved to Thornton Heath, Surrey, in 1977. The office moved to Welwyn, Hertfordshire, in 1985, where a long association with Evangelical Press began. A move to the north of England came in 1989, with a relocation of the newspaper’s base to the Darlington, County Durham. The office remained in Wooler Street, the first of three locations in the city, until 1998 when it moved to Faverdale North, to share purpose-built premises with the Evangelical Press. In 2015, a new home was needed once more after the relocation of the Evangelical Press to Wales and the newspaper’s office moved to its current premises at 3 Trinity court, Darlington.

An independent ‘voice’ 
In the course of his preaching in churches and missions from the late 1950s onwards, it had become clear to Dr Peter Masters, the founding editor, that many independent churches had little awareness of the existence and life of other like-minded churches. Groupings of churches had a degree of communication among themselves, such as Brethren, Strict Baptists, Fellowship of Independent Evangelical Churches (FIEC) churches, and Evangelical Union Baptists. However, but there were few connections beyond such ‘denominational’ boundaries and often none at all between the numerous entirely independent churches and missions in the UK. A journal that served all of evangelical independency and could develop connections, as well as share news and information, seemed to be much needed.

At the same time, there was no ‘voice’ representing independent evangelical church views. Influential Christian journals of the day included The Christian, The Life of Faith and Crusade. However, these were often based outside of the UK, aimed at specific national or other denominational groups and tended to promote ecumenism with denominations that diverged doctrinally from the reformed biblical position typically held within the UK’s independent evangelical movement.

Proposals for a new popular evangelical newspaper drew support from leading figures in UK Christian organisations, such as FIEC and the Strict Baptists (now often known as Grace Baptists). The results of a questionnaire that was sent out to hundreds of UK churches not only indicated widespread support from the 60% that replied, but also yielded information about many unknown independent churches and fellowships. This more than doubled the original recipient list to the region of around 5,000 entries. The archive of results included rich information on pastors, membership and attendance details, giving a unique picture of a vibrant church independency in the UK in the middle of the last century. Sadly, these records have not survived to the present day.

Early years journalism 
From its first issue, the Evangelical Times championed the concerns of independent churches, raising the alarm when local authorities in the UK, such as the Greater London Council (GLC), threatened to ban evangelical churches from having their own sites or building churches in new housing estates, favouring instead a large central place of worship that would be shared by all ecumenical churches. Some ecumenical churches were also pressing for the expulsion of independent congregations from new buildings that they had already built at their own expense. After the stories were published, leading to interventions and prayer, many such council decisions were reversed in favour of independent churches.

In 1971, when the Principal of Manchester Baptist College, Michael Taylor, publicly denied the deity of Jesus Christ the Evangelical Times reported the story, raising widespread concern. In his presentation at the annual Baptist Union assembly in Westminster Chapel, the principal had stated, ‘How Much of a Man is Jesus Christ? ... It could not be claimed that he was the Son of God,’ adding, ‘We have to stop short of saying unequivocally that he is God.’ Many ministers succeeded their membership over the obvious heresy and the Baptist Union’s apparent unwillingness to dissociate from Michael Taylor's statements, with the Evangelical Times supporting their stance in subsequent articles.

The Evangelical Times’ support for world mission is one of its founding aims and the newspaper regularly reports on and provides analysis of world events and issues of relevance to the global Church. The March 1979 issue featured an article on the impact of Pol Pot and the Khmer Rouge’s communist regime on the Cambodian Church, which is believed to have lost at least 80% of its original cohort of about 10,000 people, during the genocidal rule. Some 1.7 million people had died as a result of the Khmer Rouge’s Maoist policies during the four years they fully controlled the country and all religions had been brutally repressed. In the wake of the overthrow of Pol Pot on 7 January that year, new hope was mooted in the article for religious freedom in the Buddhist majority country, including the liberty of Christians to meet together.

These early years also saw the publication of many articles of ministry, including regular biographical features that went on to become best-selling books such as Men of Destiny and Men of Purpose, both by Dr Peter Masters.

Founding aims and principals 
Prior to the production of the first issue of the paper, a flyer was sent to many churches and individuals across the UK that encouraged support for the newspaper’s ‘written ministry’ as an outworking of biblical principles expressed in Paul’s New Testament letters to churches.

The apostle called for contact between churches (Ephesians 6:23; Philippians 2:19) to share information, bring encouragement and also aid meaningful prayer for others (Colossians 1:9). Paul pointedly exhorted the sharing of his letters between churches: ‘And when this letter has been read among you, have it read also in the church of the Laodiceans and see that you read also the letter from Laodicea.’ (Colossians 4:16). The original vision for Evangelical Times was to encourage the fulfilment of these biblical instructions and the apostolic example of informed prayer for other believers and churches.

The founding aims of the newspaper, which were published in various early issues, centred on sharing topical news and discussion widely across churches in a way that would facilitate ‘intelligent prayer’ for one another. It was also intended to be a dedicated Evangelical Christian ‘voice’ promoting unity in a way that was distinct from the wider ecumenical movement.

The paper sought to counter the increasing worldliness and doctrinal decline observed within the Church through clear and accurate Evangelical Christian writing on scriptural topics, giving both encouragement and spiritual nourishment in an accessible and enjoyable way. Finally, the paper aimed to encourage support for worldwide missionary endeavour.

Editors
 Dr Peter Masters (1967-1972)
David C Potter MBE (1971-1981)
 Bob Horn (1973-1985)
Bill Clark (1985-1998)
 Prof Edgar Andrews (1998-2008)
 Roger Fay (2008-2019)
 Mike Judge (incumbent)

References

External links
 Evangelical Times
Evangelical Press

1967 establishments in England
Evangelical newspapers
Evangelical organizations established in the 20th century
Newspapers established in 1967
Newspapers published in County Durham